Crater Lake–Klamath Regional Airport (Klamath Falls Airport)  is a public use airport in Klamath County, Oregon, United States, five miles southeast of Klamath Falls, which owns it. It is used by general aviation, military aviation and a few airline flights. In 2013, the name of the airport was changed to Crater Lake-Klamath Regional Airport.

The National Plan of Integrated Airport Systems for 2011–2015 categorized it as a primary commercial service airport since it has over 10,000 passenger boardings (enplanements) per year. Federal Aviation Administration records say the airport had 15,856 enplanements in 2011, a decrease from 21,353 in 2010.

As Kingsley Field Air National Guard Base, the airport is the home of the Oregon Air National Guard's 173d Fighter Wing (173 FW) flying the F-15 Eagle.  An Air Education and Training Command (AETC)-gained unit, the 173 FW specializes as an advanced air-to-air combat training center for Regular Air Force and Air National Guard F-15 pilots, as well as hosting joint and combined air combat exercises for all US military services and those of Canada.  Kingsley Field is home to a USAF flight surgeon training school.  The 173d Fighter Wing is currently under the command of Colonel Jeff Smith.

History
In 1928, the citizens of Klamath Falls approved the sale of $50,000 worth of bonds to build Klamath Falls Municipal Airport. It had gravel runways and one Fixed-Base Operator; in 1942, it was selected for a Naval Air Station later named NAS Klamath Falls. In 1945, the airport was transferred back to civil use; the January 1952 C&GS diagram shows runway 7 (5258 ft long), 14 (7134 ft) and 18 (5164 ft).

In 1954, the airport was selected as a site for U.S. Air Force installation under a joint civil-military arrangement supporting Air Defense Command, later Aerospace Defense Command (ADC) aircraft and squadrons. In 1957 the airport was dedicated as Kingsley Field in honor of 2nd Lieutenant David R. Kingsley, USAAF, an Oregonian killed in action on June 23, 1944, after a B-17 bombing mission over the oil fields of Ploiesti, Roumania. In 1976, ADC was inactivated and control of the military installation passed to Tactical Air Command (TAC).  In 1978, the Department of Defense closed Kingsley Field as a regular Air Force installation, transferring all military facilities to the Air National Guard.

Facilities
Crater Lake–Klamath Regional Airport covers 1,166 acres (472 ha) at an elevation of 4,095 feet (1,248 m). It has two runways: 14/32 is 10,301 by 150 feet (3,140 x 46 m) asphalt and concrete; 7/25 is 5,258 by 100 feet (1,603 x 30 m) asphalt.

In 2011, the airport had 39,004 aircraft operations, average 106 per day: 43% general aviation, 41% military, 14% air taxi, and 2% airline. 170 aircraft were then based at the airport: 62% single-engine, 19% jet, 15% military, 3% multi-engine, and 1% helicopter.

The airport is home to the Klamath Falls Interagency Fire Center, the Klamath Falls Airtanker Base and the Tanker 61 Memorial, commemorating a TBM Inc. firebomber lost in 1992.

Airline history
Until 1959, United Airlines Douglas DC-3s and Convair 340s served Klamath Falls; later West Coast Airlines flew Fairchild F-27s to cities in Oregon and California. West Coast merged with Bonanza Air Lines and Pacific Air Lines to form Air West which subsequently changed its name to Hughes Airwest and was then later merged into Republic Airlines.  Air West and Hughes Airwest continued to serve the airport with F-27s.  Hughes Airwest introduced the first jets, Douglas DC-9-10 and McDonnell Douglas DC-9-30s, and was operating nonstop flights to Redding, CA and Redmond, OR as well as direct service to San Francisco, Seattle and Eugene, OR in 1980; successor Republic DC-9s continued to serve the airport with nonstop flights to Redding and Redmond as well as flying direct jet service to San Francisco, Seattle and Portland, OR in 1982 before ceasing serving Klamath Falls in 1983. United Airlines returned with Boeing 737 jets direct to San Francisco in March, 1986 but the service ended in November, 1987.

From the late 1970s to early 1980s, Air Oregon Fairchild Swearingen Metroliners flew direct to Portland, Seattle and other cities. In the mid-1980s, Pacific Express BAC One-Eleven jets flew to San Francisco via Redding and to Portland via Redmond. Horizon Air, a subsidiary of Alaska Airlines, flew de Havilland Canada DHC-8 Dash 8s and Fairchild Swearingen Metroliners to Portland and Seattle.  From the mid-1980s to the early 1990s American Eagle Fairchild Swearingen Metroliners flew direct to San Francisco and San Jose, CA via Chico, CA or Redding on behalf of American Airlines.  WestAir operating as United Express) flew BAe Jetstream 31s to San Francisco while Reno Air Express operated by Mid Pacific Air on behalf of Reno Air) flew BAe Jetstream 31s to San Jose, CA. United Express operated by SkyWest Airlines pulled out of Klamath Falls in the late 1990s but then resumed flights when Horizon Air ceased serving the airport.

SkyWest Embraer EMB-120 Brasilias operated the last United Express service into Klamath Falls. In late 2010, SkyWest dropped one flight to Portland. Passenger count dropped in 2011, but passengers per flight increased. United Express, operated by SkyWest on behalf of United Airlines, terminated service to Portland and San Francisco on June 5, 2014.

PenAir started Saab 340B flights from Klamath Falls to Portland on October 6, 2016. Initially, the proposed service by PenAir was on hold from 2015 due to federal Transportation Security Administration (TSA) refusal to station security personnel at the terminal. As of August 2017, this service has ended, following PenAir filing for bankruptcy.

Airlines and destinations

The airport currently does not have scheduled passenger air service.

Cargo

Funding
The Airport City Fund operates the airport's civilian and military interest. Revenue mainly is from city property taxes, transient room taxes and the rental activities in the airport itself. Because of the commercial flights at the airport, the Federal Aviation Administration contributes funds to keep the runways and taxiways in good conditions.

See also
 Sky Lakes Medical Center Heliport

References

External links

 Klamath Falls Airport, official website
 Aerial image as of July 2000 from USGS The National Map
 
 
 

Airports in Klamath County, Oregon
Buildings and structures in Klamath Falls, Oregon
1928 establishments in Oregon
Closed installations of the United States Navy